33rd parallel may refer to:

33rd parallel north, a circle of latitude in the Northern Hemisphere
33rd parallel south, a circle of latitude in the Southern Hemisphere